The Low Rocky Point is a location on the south west coast of Tasmania and Australia, that is used as a location for weather forecasting. It is almost due west of Hobart, it is south of Point Hibbs and north of South West Cape.

Location and features
An application was made to establish a shore-based bay whaling station in the area in the 19th century. It is not clear if any whaling actually took place there.

Wrecks and other events in the region use the location as a reference point.

In the early twentieth century, the need for a light was canvassed.

It is also an important reference point for nautical maps.

To the south east and east of the point is Elliott Bay.

It is also a location on the west coast walking track between Cape Sorell and Port Davey.

Climate

See also

Sandy Cape

References

Headlands of Tasmania
South West coast of Tasmania